Thomas Andrew Noble Bredin (1927-1989) was Dean of Clonmacnoise from 1979 until 1989.

Bredin was educated at Trinity College, Dublin.  He was ordained in 1952. After a curacy in Waterford he was Dean's Vicar at Kilkenny Cathedral. He also held incumbencies at Moynalty, Roscrea and Kilteskill. He was Archdeacon of Killaloe, Kilfenora, Clonfert and Kilmacduagh  before his time as Dean.

References

1927 births
1989 deaths
Alumni of Trinity College Dublin
Archdeacons of Killaloe, Kilfenora, Clonfert and Kilmacduagh
Deans of Clonmacnoise
20th-century Irish Anglican priests